The Daughters of Our Lady of the Garden  (Italian: Figlie di Maria Santissima dell'Orto; Latin: Congregatio Filiarum Mariae Sanctissimae ab Horto; abbreviation: F.M.H.) is a religious institute of pontifical right whose members profess public vows of chastity, poverty, and obedience and follow the evangelical way of life in common.

Their mission includes pastoral ministry, education of youth, care of the sick, and the elderly.

This religious institute was founded in Chiavari, near Genoa, in 1829, by Antonio Maria Gianelli, later bishop of Bobbio, and his collaborator, Caterina Podestà.

The sisters have houses in Argentina, Bolivia, Brazil, Chile, Congo, India, Italy, Jordan, Palestine, Paraguay, Spain, United States, Uruguay. The Generalate of the Congregation can be found in Rome, Italy.

On 31 December 2005 there were 781 sisters in 125 communities.

External links
Daughters of Our Lady of the Garden official site

Catholic female orders and societies
Religious organizations established in 1829
Catholic religious institutes established in the 19th century
1829 establishments in Italy